Verticordia sect. Corymbiformis is one of eleven sections in the subgenus Verticordia. It includes five species of plants in the genus Verticordia. When Alex George reviewed the genus in 1991 he formally described this section, publishing the description in the journal Nuytsia. The name Corymbiformis is derived from the Latin word corymbus meaning "a bunch of flowers" and the suffix -formis meaning "shaped" referring to the flower arrangement of the species in this section.

The type species for this section is Verticordia brownii and the other four species are V. polytricha, V. densiflora, V. eriocephala and V. capillaris.

References

Corymbiformis
Rosids of Western Australia
Plant sections